The 1997 season was Shimizu S-Pulse's sixth season in existence and their fifth season in the J1 League. The club also competed in the Emperor's Cup and the J.League Cup. The team finished the season fifth in the league.

Competitions

Domestic results

J.League

Emperor's Cup

J.League Cup

Player statistics

 † player(s) joined the team after the opening of this season.

Transfers

In:

Out:

Transfers during the season

In
Mark Rossllyn Bowen (on March)

Out
Mark Rossllyn Bowen (on September)

Awards
none

References
J.LEAGUE OFFICIAL GUIDE 1997, 1997 
J.LEAGUE OFFICIAL GUIDE 1998, 1996 
J.LEAGUE YEARBOOK 1999, 1999

Other pages
 J. League official site
 Shimizu S-Pulse official site

Shimizu S-Pulse
Shimizu S-Pulse seasons